Morkhoven is a village in the Belgian province of Antwerp belonging to the municipality of the city of Herentals.

History
The village was first mentioned in 1286 as belonging to the Land of Geel. Until the early 16th century it was part of the heerlijkheid of Noorderwijk.

The Freedom Tilia is a tree planted during the Brabant Revolution. The current tree dates from the Belgian Revolution of 1830.

The economy used to be based on agriculture, however in the 20th century it became mainly a residential zone. The municipality was merged into Herentals in 1977.

Notable people
 Iris (born 1995), singer and Eurovision Song contestant.
 Joseph Verhaert (1927–1999), racing cyclist.

References

External links 
 

Populated places in Antwerp Province
Herentals